Bentley usually refers to Bentley Motors Limited, a British manufacturer of cars.

Bentley may also refer to:

Businesses and organizations 
 Bentley University, Waltham, Massachusetts, U.S.
 Bentley Film Festival, or The Bentley's, in Kansas City, Missouri, U.S.
 Bentley High School (Burton, Michigan), U.S.
 Bentley High School (Livonia, Michigan), U.S.
 Bentley Systems, an American software company
 Bentley & Co, a Canadian luggage and handbag retailer

Places

United Kingdom
 Bentley, East Riding of Yorkshire
 Great Bentley, Essex
 Great Bentley railway station
 Bentley, Essex, a location in Brentwood unparished area
 Little Bentley, Essex
 Bentley, Hampshire
Bentley railway station (Hampshire)
 Bentley, Suffolk
Bentley railway station (Suffolk) (closed 1966)
 Bentley, South Yorkshire
Bentley railway station (South Yorkshire)
 Bentley, Warwickshire
 Bentley, West Midlands
Bentley railway station (West Midlands) (closed 1898)
 Bentley, Worcestershire

United States
 Bentley, Illinois
 Bentley, Kansas
 Bentley, Michigan
 Bentley, North Dakota
 Bentley Township, Michigan

Other countries
 Bentley Subglacial Trench, Antarctica
 Mount Bentley, Antarctica
 Bentley, Western Australia
 Bentley, Alberta, Canada

People 
 Bentley (surname)
 Chukwuma Akabueze, Nigerian footballer nicknamed "Bentley"

Other uses 
 Bentley (Sly Cooper character), from the Sly Cooper video game series
 Bentley site, an archaeological site in Kentucky.

See also

Bently (disambiguation)
 Bentley Priory, stately home and deer park in Stanmore, England
 RAF Bentley Priory
 Bentley's Miscellany, a literary magazine 1836–1868
 Bentleigh (disambiguation)